The World's Greatest Superheroes was a syndicated newspaper comic strip featuring DC Comics characters which ran Sunday and daily from April 3, 1978, to February 10, 1985. It was syndicated by the Chicago Tribune/New York News Syndicate.

Initially starring Superman, Batman, Robin, Wonder Woman, the Flash and Black Lightning,  it underwent several title changes, as the focus changed to primarily feature Superman.

Writers: Martin Pasko scripted at the beginning. Paul Levitz took over October 15, 1979 until March 22, 1981, with his initial story coming from a Pasko idea. Gerry Conway then picked up the assignment. A continuity from Mike W. Barr followed, appearing October 26, 1981 through January 10, 1982. Paul Kupperberg handled continuities from January 11, 1982, until the end, including a segment from January 12 through March 12, 1981, that he ghosted for Levitz. Bob Rozakis wrote all but two of The Superman Sunday Specials.

Artists: Initially dailies and Sundays were penciled by George Tuska and inked by Vince Colletta. At various times from April 25 until November 13, 1982, the strip was worked on by Tuska, Colletta, José Delbo, Bob Smith, Frank McLaughlin and Sal Trapani. Delbo and Trapani then illustrated the feature from November 14, 1982, until the end.

References
The Speeding Bullet: A Complete Archive of Superman Newspaper Strips

Publications disestablished in 1985
American comic strips
1978 comics debuts
1988 comics endings
DC Comics titles
Superman in other media
Batman in other media
Wonder Woman in other media
Superhero comic strips